The Dark Side of the Moon is a Russian detective television series, based on the BBC series Life on Mars. Like the original series it was adapted from, although with the original script rewritten to better fit the Soviet era, the series combines elements of the genres speculative fiction and police procedural, featuring a present-day police captain from the Moscow City Police (played by Pavel Derevyanko) who wakes up in 1979 as his deceased father in the days of the Soviet Union after being hit by a car while in pursuit of a criminal in 2011. The title is a reference to the Pink Floyd album of the same name, owing to Pink Floyd's underground popularity in 1970s Russia.

The show was produced by Sreda for broadcast on Channel One Russia, first airing on November 5, 2012. It was later renewed for a second season, which aired on December 5, 2016.

Plot
In 2011, Mikhail Soloviev Jr. (Pavel Derevyanko) is a captain of the Moscow City Police, who for three years, has been on the hunt of a violent maniac known as 'Red', responsible for the murders of young women around the capital. In the ensuing operation to arrest 'Red', however, Soloviev's partner is killed, and he is hit by a car while chasing him. However, he then wakes up in hospital in the body of his father, Mikhail Soloviev Sr., a captain of the Moscow Municipal Militsiya in 1979.

Mikhail is unsure whether he is dreaming while in a coma, if he has gone insane, or if he really has travelled back in time. However, with his comatose body still in 2011, he can occasionally hear the conversations that his relatives, colleagues, and the doctors caring for have from the present day. He is forced to adapt the alien environment of Moscow in the days of the Soviet Union, and as a Soviet policeman, he must resume his job of solving crimes as before, and above all else, he must figure out exactly why he went back to 1979 as his father and how he can return home to 2011 as himself again.

References

External links

2012 Russian television series debuts
2018 Russian television series endings
2010s Russian television series
Russian police procedural television series
Russian time travel television series
Russian television series based on British television series
Life on Mars (franchise)
Russian-language television shows
Television series by Sreda
Channel One Russia original programming
Fictional portrayals of the Moscow City Police
Television series set in 1979
Television series set in 2011